Mizong may refer to:
 Tangmi (唐密), also known as Mìzōng (密宗), Chinese traditions of Esoteric Buddhism
 Mízōngyì (迷蹤藝), a Chinese martial art